Roland Weller (11 September 1938 – 23 January 2023) was a French businessman. He served as President of RC Strasbourg Alsace from 1994 to 1997.

Biography
Born in Strasbourg on 11 September 1938, Weller first worked as a chef, founding the company  in 1978. He became president of SC Schiltigheim, then of RC Strasbourg Alsace in 1994. In 1997, the city decided to sell its shares in the club and it was sold to IMG. He left his post as president in June 1997. However, he remained popular among sports fans in Strasbourg following his tenure.

Weller died on 23 January 2023, at the age of 84.

References

1938 births
2023 deaths
20th-century French businesspeople
21st-century French businesspeople
French football chairmen and investors
RC Strasbourg Alsace non-playing staff
Businesspeople from Strasbourg